Abdallah Mabel (born April 14, 1983), also known as "La Panthère", is a French-Cameroonian Muay Thai kickboxer, famous for his technical and unpredictable fighting style.

Biography and career

Biography 
Abdallah Mabel was born on 14 April 1983. Mabel resides in Lyon, France and trains at Gym boxing St Fons in Lyon, Saint-Fons. His trainer is Nasser Kacem.

He begins Muaythai at the age of 15-16, with Nasser Kacem who was educator in the suburbs of Lyon. Fan of Van Damme and Bruce Lee, he decided out of curiosity to see one of his classes. Then came the era of televised galas on Canal Plus with great boxers such as Jo Prestia, Dany Bill, Ramon Dekkers and others that made him want to invest 100% in this sport. The success of the K-1 World Max is for something as well.

Being the youngest of his family and seeing that he accumulated successes, his older brothers have totally entrusted to Nasser Kacem. To exercise his passion, Abdallah shares his time between training and working as an educator in his hometown.

Early career 
After 11 years of practice, it counts 102 fights, 86 wins (including 22 by knockout), 18 defeats and 3 draws. Abdallah Mabel fought in Muaythai, in Kickboxing and Full Contact.

In 2005 he was French Muay Thai Champion Class B, WPKC Intercontinental Kick Boxing Champion. In 2007 he became WFC World Muay Thai Champion. In 2009 he won the title of Champion WAKO World Full Contact and TK2 World Max tournament. In 2010 he won the UKC France MAX tournament, he reached the finals of the Explosion Fight Night Vol.01 and he won again the tournament TK2 World MAX.

Mabel fought the biggest names in Muay Thai and Kickboxing : Farid Villaume, Kaoponglek, Giorgio Petrosyan, Big Ben, Karim Ghajji, Kem Sitsongpeenong, Saiyok, Naruepol Fairtex.

He faced Super X Por.Petchnamchai at Thai Fight: Lyon on September 19, 2012 in Lyon, France, and won via TKO in the second round.

He defeated Bruce Codron by third-round TKO due to doctor stoppage at Nuit des Champions in Marseilles on November 24, 2012.

Mabel will fight Johann Fauveau at Warriors Night in Levallois, France on March 2, 2013.

He challenged Bernueng TopKingBoxing in a fight for the WMC World Middleweight (-72.5 kg/160 lb) Championship at Monte Carlo Fighting Masters 2014 in Monte Carlo, Monaco on June 14, 2014, losing via TKO due to injury in round three.

Titles and achievements
Professional:
 2014 A1 WGP Tournament Runner up -70 kg 
 2011 W.P.M.F. World Muaythai Champion -72.500 kg
 2010 TK2 World Max Tournament Champion -70 kg
 2010 Explosion Fight Night Volume 01 Tournament Runner Up -71 kg
 2010 UKC France MAX Tournament Champion -70 kg
 2009 "Nuit des Champions" Muaythai belt -73 kg
 2009 TK2 World Max Tournament Champion -70 kg
 2009 W.A.K.O. Full Contact World Champion -72.600 kg
 2007 W.F.C. World Muay Thai Champion -72.58 kg
 2005 W.P.K.C. Intercontinental Kickboxing Champion
Amateur:
 2005 French Muay Thai Champion Class B -71 kg

Kickboxing record

|-  style="background:#fbb;"
| 2018-10-27 || Loss ||align=left| Yoann Kongolo || Fight Legend Geneva || Geneva, Switzerland || Decision  || 3 || 3:00
|-  style="background:#cfc;"
| 2018-02-03|| Win ||align=left| Pawel Biszczac ||DSF Kickboxing Challenge || Poland || Decision  ||3 || 3:00
|-  style="background:#cfc;"
| 2017-12-16|| Win ||align=left| Hristo Hristov ||La Nuit Des Challenges 17 || France || Decision (Unanimous) ||3 || 3:00
|-  style="background:#fbb;"
| 2015-08-22 || Loss ||align=left| Mustapha Haida ||VVWS, Final || Debrecen, Hungary || Ext. R. Decision (Majority) ||3 || 3:00 
|-
! style=background:white colspan=9 |
|-  style="background:#cfc;"
| 2015-08-22 || Win ||align=left| Norbert Balogh ||VVWS, Semi-finals || Debrecen, Hungary || Decision (Unanimous) ||3 ||3:00 
|-  style="background:#fbb;"
| 2014-11-22 || Loss ||align=left| Sitthichai Sitsongpeenong || La 21ème Nuit des Champions, Semi-finals  || Marseille, France || Decision || 3 ||  3:00
|-  style="background:#fbb;"
| 2014-10-23 || Loss ||align=left| Chingiz Allazov || A1 WCC Lyon, Final || Lyon, France || Decision || 3 || 3:00
|-
! style=background:white colspan=9 |
|-  style="background:#cfc;"
| 2014-10-23 || Win ||align=left| Jimmy Vienot || A1 WCC Lyon, Semi-finals  || Lyon, France || DQ (Ref. Stop./Three warning) ||  || 
|-  style="background:#fbb;"
| 2014-06-14 || Loss ||align=left| Berneung Topkingboxing || Monte Carlo Fighting Masters 2014 || Monte Carlo, Monaco || TKO (injury) || 3 || 
|-
! style=background:white colspan=9 |
|-  style="background:#fbb;"
| 2014-03-01 || Loss ||align=left| Yuri Bessmertny || Nitrianska Noc Bojovníkov  || Nitra, Slovakia || KO || 2 || 
|-  style="background:#cfc;"
| 2014-02-08 || Win ||align=left| Rungrawee Kietpatharapan || La Nuit des Titans, final || Tours, France || KO || ||
|-
! style=background:white colspan=9 |
|-  style="background:#cfc;"
| 2014-02-08 || Win ||align=left| Farhad Akhmedjanov || La Nuit des Titans, semifinal || Tours, France || Decision || || 
|-  style="background:#fbb;"
| 2014-01-25 || Loss ||align=left| Saiyok Pumpanmuang || Ring War || Milan, Italy || TKO (cut) || ||
|-  style="background:#cfc;"
| 2013-12-14 || Win ||align=left| Johann Fauveau || Victory || Paris, France || Decision (Unanimous) || || 3:00
|-  style="background:#cfc;"
| 2013-10-19 || Win ||align=left| Sophien Hassi || THAI MAX || France || TKO || 1 || 
|-  style="background:#cfc;"
| 2013-09-21 || Win ||align=left| Soloman Wickstead || La Nuit des Challenges 12 || Saint-Fons France || TKO || 2 || 
|-
! style=background:white colspan=9 |
|-  style="background:#fbb;"
| 2013-03-02 || Loss ||align=left| Djimé Coulibaly || Warriors Night || Levallois, France || Decision (Unanimous) || || 3:00
|-  style="background:#cfc;"
| 2012-11-24 || Win ||align=left| Bruce Codron || Nuit des Champions || Marseilles, France || TKO (doctor stoppage) || 3 || 
|-  style="background:#cfc;"
| 2012-09-19 || Win ||align=left| Super X Por.Petchnamchai || THAI FIGHT Extreme 2012: France || Lyon, France || TKO (referee stoppage) || 2 || 
|-  style="background:#fbb;"
| 2012-08-17 || Loss ||align=left| Armin Pumpanmuang Windy Sport || THAI FIGHT Extreme 2012: England || Leicester, England || TKO (Referee Stoppage) || 2 ||
|-  style="background:#cfc;"
| 2012-06-02 || Win ||align=left| Palangnum Laemthonggarnpaet || La Nuit des Challenges 11 || Lyon, France || TKO (Referee Stoppage) || 3 || 
|-  style="background:#fbb;"
| 2011-12-17 || Loss ||align=left| Sudsakorn Sor Klinmee || Fight Code - Dragon Series, Semi-final || Debrecen, Hungary || Decision (Unanimous) || 3 || 3:00
|-  style="background:#cfc;"
| 2011-11-26 || Win ||align=left| Xu Yan || Fight Code - Rhinos Series, Quarter-finals || Geneva, Switzerland || Decision (Unanimous) || 3 || 3:00
|-  style="background:#cfc;"
| 2011-11-12 || Win ||align=left| Gregory Choplin || La 18ème Nuit des Champions || Marseille, France || Decision || 5 || 3:00
|-
! style=background:white colspan=9 |
|-  style="background:#cfc;"
| 2011-10-15 || Win ||align=left| Xu Yan || Fight Code - Dragon Series, Quarter-finals || Marseilles, France || Decision || 3 || 3:00
|-  style="background:#fbb;"
| 2011-09-25 || Loss ||align=left| Buakaw Por. Pramuk || Thai Fight 2011 70 kg Tournament, Quarter-final || Bangkok, Thailand || Decision || 3 || 3:00
|-  style="background:#cfc;"
| 2011-06-04 || Win ||align=left| Chanachai Kaewsamrit || La Nuit des Challenges 10 || Lyon, Saint-Fons, France || Decision || 5 || 3:00
|-  style="background:#fbb;"
| 2011-05-14 || Loss ||align=left| Sudsakorn Sor Klinmee || THAI FIGHT Extreme 2011: France || Cannes, France || Decision || 3 || 3:00
|-  style="background:#cfc;"
| 2011-01-29 || Win ||align=left| Vladimir Shulyak || Fight Code - Dragon Series, Final 16 || Torino, Italy || TKO || 3 ||
|-  style="background:#cfc;"
| 2010-12-18 || Win ||align=left| Naruepol Fairtex || La Nuit des Challenges 9 || Lyon, France || TKO (Elbow/Cut) || 3 || 
|-  style="background:#fbb;"
| 2010-11-26 || Loss ||align=left| Kem Sitsongpeenong || La Nuit des Champions 2010 || Marseilles, France || Decision || 5 || 3:00
|-
! style=background:white colspan=9 |
|-  style="background:#fbb;"
| 2010-10-29 || Loss ||align=left| Saiyok Pumpanmuang || France vs Lumpinee || Paris, France || Decision || 5 || 3:00
|-
! style=background:white colspan=9 |
|-  style="background:#cfc;"
| 2010-10-09 || Win ||align=left| Philippe Salmon || TK2 World MAX 2010, Final || Aix-en-Provence, France || KO || 1 || 
|-
! style=background:white colspan=9 |
|-  style="background:#cfc;"
| 2010-10-09 || Win ||align=left| Mihai Barbu || TK2 World MAX 2010, Semi-final || Aix-en-Provence, France || Decision || 3 || 3:00
|-  style="background:#cfc;"
| 2010-10-09 || Win ||align=left| Jordy Van Der Sluijs || TK2 World MAX 2010, Quarter-final || Aix-en-Provence, France || TKO (Doctor Stoppage) || 2 || 
|-  style="background:#fbb;"
| 2010-06-19 || Loss ||align=left| Kem Sitsongpeenong || Explosion Fight Night Volume 01, Final || Brest, France || Decision || 4 || 3:00
|-
! style=background:white colspan=9 |
|-  style="background:#cfc;"
| 2010-06-19 || Win ||align=left| Morad Salhi || Explosion Fight Night Volume 01, Semi-final || Brest, France || Decision || 3 || 3:00
|-  style="background:#cfc;"
| 2010-06-05 || Win ||align=left| Walid Haddad || La Nuit des Challenges 8 || Lyon, Saint-Fons, France || TKO || 1 || 
|-  style="background:#cfc;"
| 2010-02-06 || Win ||align=left| Karim Ghajji || UKC France MAX, Final || Dijon, France || KO (Right flying knee) || 2 || 
|-
! style=background:white colspan=9 |
|-  style="background:#cfc;"
| 2010-02-06 || Win ||align=left| Mickael Lallemand || UKC France MAX, Semi-final || Dijon, France || KO || 1 || 
|-  style="background:#cfc;"
| 2010-02-06 || Win ||align=left| Ali Alkayis || UKC France MAX, Quarter-final || Dijon, France || TKO || 3 || 
|-  style="background:#fbb;"
| 2009-11-28 || Loss ||align=left| Big Ben Chor Praram 6 || A-1 World Cup Combat Lyon || Lyon, France || KO || 1 || 
|-
! style=background:white colspan=9 |
|-  style="background:#cfc;"
| 2009-11-14 || Win ||align=left| Farid Villaume || La Nuit des Champions 2009 || Marseille, France || Decision || 5 || 3:00
|-
! style=background:white colspan=9 |
|-  style="background:#cfc;"
| 2009-10-09 || Win ||align=left| Jeremy Sportouch || TK2 World MAX 2009, Final || Aix-en-Provence, France || TKO || 1 || 
|-
! style=background:white colspan=9 |
|-  style="background:#cfc;"
| 2009-10-09 || Win ||align=left| Philippe Salmon || TK2 World MAX 2009, Semi-final || Aix-en-Provence, France || KO || 2 || 
|-  style="background:#cfc;"
| 2009-10-09 || Win ||align=left| Andy Toth Arpad Gabor || TK2 World MAX 2009, Quarter-final || Aix-en-Provence, France || KO || 1 || 
|-  style="background:#fbb;"
| 2009-06-26 || Loss ||align=left| Thanondet Artwichian || Gala International Multi-Boxes || Paris, France || Decision || 5 || 3:00
|-  style="background:#cfc;"
| 2009-05-16 || Win ||align=left| Tahir Menxhiqi || Légendes et Guerriers || Toulouse, France || Decision || 5 || 2:00
|-  style="background:#fbb;"
| 2009-05-30 || Loss ||align=left| Lionel Picord || Le Choc des Gladiateurs || Clichy, France || Disqualification || 8 || 
|-
! style=background:white colspan=9 |
|-  style="background:#cfc;"
| 2009-02-21 || Win ||align=left| Eric Schmitt || Finale mondiale WAKO Pro || Aix-en-Provence, France || Decision || 12 || 2
|-
! style=background:white colspan=9 |
|-  style="background:#fbb;"
| 2008-12-19 || Loss ||align=left| Dmitry Valent || Contender Asia Qualifier, Quarter-final || Chelyabinsk, Russia || Decision || 3 || 3:00
|-  style="background:#fbb;"
| 2008-10-11 || Loss ||align=left| Michał Głogowski || TK2 World MAX 2008, Quarter-final || Aix-en-Provence, France || Decision || 3 || 3:00
|-  style="background:#fbb;"
| 2008-09-20 || Loss ||align=left| Harut Grigorian || S-Cup Europe 2008, Reserve Fight || Gorinchem, Netherlands || Decision || 3 || 3:00
|-  style="background:#c5d2ea;"
| 2008-07-06 || Draw ||align=left| Fabio Siciliani || The Warrior's Fighting IX || Italy || Decision draw || 5 || 3:00
|-  style="background:#fbb;"
| 2008-06-12 || Loss ||align=left| Jonathan Camara || Gala de Levallois || Levallois, France || Decision (Unanimous) || 5 || 3:00
|-  style="background:#cfc;"
| 2008-06-07 || Win ||align=left| Walid Haddad || La Nuit des Challenges 5 || Lyon, Saint-Fons, France || Decision (Unanimous) || 5 || 3:00
|-  style="background:#cfc;"
| 2008-05-09 || Win ||align=left| Ernestas Dapkus || Battle of Champions 4-men tournament || Chelyabinsk, Russia || KO || 1 || 
|-  style="background:#cfc;"
| 2008-01-26 || Win ||align=left| Tarik Benfkih || La Nuit des Titans III || Tours, France || KO || 1 || 
|-  style="background:#cfc;"
| 2008-00-00 || Win ||align=left| Masigliano Girardi || Full Contact match || France || TKO (Gave up) || 1 || 
|-  style="background:#fbb;"
| 2007-11-24 || Loss ||align=left| Giorgio Petrosyan || Janus Fight Night 2007, Semi-final || Padova, Italy || Decision (Unanimous) || 3 || 3:00
|-  style="background:#cfc;"
| 2007-11-24 || Win ||align=left| Fadi Merza || Janus Fight Night 2007, Quarter-final || Padova, Italy || TKO || 2 || 
|-  style="background:#c5d2ea;"
| 2007-11-17 || Draw ||align=left| Sofiane Allouache || La Nuit des Champions 2007 || Marseille, France || Decision draw || 3 || 3:00
|-  style="background:#fbb;"
| 2007-10-12 || Loss ||align=left| Gürkan Özkan || A-1 Combat World Cup || Istanbul, Turkey || TKO || 1 || 
|-  style="background:#fbb;"
| 2007-09-24 || Loss ||align=left| Yuri Bulat || Kings of Muaythai : Belarus vs Europe || Minsk, Belarus || Decision (Split) || 5 || 3:00
|-
! style=background:white colspan=9 |
|-  style="background:#fbb;"
| 2007-07-27 || Loss ||align=left| Giorgio Petrosyan || Serata Muaythai Gala || Trieste, Italy || TKO || 5 ||
|-  style="background:#cfc;"
| 2007-07-20 || Win ||align=left| Piotr Woźnicki || A-1 Cyprus || Cyprus || TKO || 2 || 
|-  style="background:#cfc;"
| 2007-07-20 || Win ||align=left| Kara Murat || A-1 Cyprus || Cyprus || Decision || 3 || 
|-  style="background:#cfc;"
| 2007-06-09 || Win ||align=left| Arnold Gond || La Nuit des Challenges 4 || Lyon, Saint-Fons, France || Decision (Unanimous) || 5 || 3:00
|-  style="background:#fbb;"
| 2007-05-26 || Loss ||align=left| Giorgio Petrosyan || Muay Thai Event in Padova || Padova, Italy || Decision (Unanimous) || 3 || 3:00
|-  style="background:#fbb;"
| 2007-05-12 || Loss ||align=left| Ibragim Tamazaev || Kickboxing Superstar XVII || Milan, Italy || TKO || 4 || 
|-  style="background:#fbb;"
| 2007-04-07 || Loss ||align=left| Djimé Coulibaly || La Nuit des Supers Fights VII, Semi-final || Villebon, France || Decision || 5 || 3:00
|-  style="background:#cfc;"
| 2007-04-07 || Win ||align=left| Morad Bourachid || La Nuit des Supers Fights VII, Quarter-final || Villebon, France || Decision || 5 || 3:00
|-  style="background:#cfc;"
| 2007-03-17 || Win ||align=left| Rudaj Züber || La Notte dei Guerrieri || San Giovanni Rotondo, Italy || TKO || 4 || 
|-
! style=background:white colspan=9 |
|-  style="background:#cfc;"
| 2007-02-24 || Win ||align=left| Bartosz Koscielniak || Jesolo Fight Night 2007 || Jesolo, Italy || Decision || 5 || 3:00
|-  style="background:#cfc;"
| 2007-02-17 || Win ||align=left| Sakmongkol Sithchuchok || La Nuit des Titans II || Tours, France || Decision || 5 || 3:00
|-  style="background:#cfc;"
| 2007-00-00 || Win ||align=left| Fabrizio Mazzuri || Kickboxing Match || Italy || KO || 2 || 
|-  style="background:#cfc;"
| 2006-12-17 || Win ||align=left| Gürkan Özkan || A-1 Combat World Cup || Turkey || TKO || 2 || 
|-  style="background:#cfc;"
| 2006-12-09 || Win ||align=left| Rudaj Züber || Muay Thai in Action || Zürich, Switzerland || Decision || 5 || 3:00
|-  style="background:#cfc;"
| 2006-12-02 || Win ||align=left| Foad Sadeghi || Lugano Grand Prix 4 || Lugano, Switzerland || Decision (Unanimous) || 3 || 3:00
|-  style="background:#fbb;"
| 2006-10-21 || Loss ||align=left| Farid Villaume || A-1 World Combat Cup, Semi-final || Istanbul, Turkey || KO || 2 || 
|-  style="background:#cfc;"
| 2006-10-15 || Win ||align=left| Senol Kiziltas || A-1 World Combat Cup || Istanbul, Turkey || KO || 1 || 
|-  style="background:#fbb;"
| 2006-09-21 || Loss ||align=left| Valon Basha || A-1 Final 8 Ankara || Ankara, Turkey || KO || 1 || 
|-  style="background:#cfc;"
| 2006-09-09 || Win ||align=left| Sahran Benmohammed || A-1 Antalya || Antalya, Turkey || Decision || 3 || 3:00
|-  style="background:#cfc;"
| 2006-06-03 || Win ||align=left| Sak Kaoponlek || La Nuit des Challenges 3 || Lyon, Saint-Fons, France || KO || 3 || 
|-  style="background:#cfc;"
| 2006-04-22 || Win ||align=left| Moussa Konaté || Nuit du Muay Thaï et des Arts Martiaux || Pau, France || Decision || 5 || 3:00
|-  style="background:#c5d2ea;"
| 2005-06-10 || NC ||align=left| Matteo Sciacca || Muay Thai a Fiume Veneto || Italy || No Contest || 1 || 2:11
|-  style="background:#c5d2ea;"
| 2005-04-30 || Draw ||align=left| Samir Berbachi || Post Tenebra Cup 2005 || Geneva, Switzerland || Decision draw || 3 || 3:00
|-  style="background:#cfc;"
| 2005-05-14 || Win ||align=left| Kamel Gillet || French Championship 2005 Class B, Final || Paris, France || KO || 3 || 
|-
! style=background:white colspan=9 |
|-  style="background:#cfc;"
| 2005-03-26 || Win ||align=left| Ibrahim Karaboue || French Championship 2005 Class B, Semi-final || Paris, France || KO || 3 || 
|-
| colspan=9 | Legend:

See also
List of male kickboxers

References

External links
Abdallah Mabel profile

1983 births
Living people
French male kickboxers
Welterweight kickboxers
French Muay Thai practitioners